Gailen David is an American TV presenter, producer, and labor activist. He is best known for Take Off! With the Savvy Stews and an appearance in the film, Miami Shakedown. Background 
David began his career in 1977, at the age of 10, when he began working as an amateur travel agent. At the age of 19, he began applying for flight attendant jobs and became an attendant in American Airlines in 1988. In 1998, after several inflight conflicts with passengers, he took an extended leave of absence. 10 months later he came back with a positive attitude and began his second virtual career as a motivational speaker making presentations at workshops about how he became a good purser using a video clips series starring entitled Why I Fly—Gailen's Story, before being yanked by American Airlines citing copyright issues.

In 2012, David was fired from his job after 24-years as a flight attendant at American Airlines after he posted a series of management-parody videos entitled, Aluminum Lady, which criticized the unfair treatment of workers during American’s bankruptcy. In April 2012, American sued him in Tarrant County state district court in Texas, accusing him of releasing passengers’ private travel information, when he publicly revealed the airline’s executives moving first class passengers to coach to make room for themselves and traveling companions and board members delaying flights for their convenience, American eventually dropped the lawsuit. TV career 
In September 2014, David began appearing in Take Off! With the Savvy Stews, an American travel-themed television series hosted by The Savvy Stews, Bobby Laurie and David and aired on CNN Airport.

In February 2016, co-created The Jet Set, American travel-themed nationally syndicated television series hosted by Bobby Laurie, Jessica Reyes and David'' and aired by several stations such as AMGTV, Z Living, ABC, NBC, and CBS.

Filmography

References 

American television personalities
Travel broadcasters
Living people
Year of birth missing (living people)